Bărăția is the name of some Catholic churches in Wallachia and Moldavia (now in Romania):

 Bucharest Bărăția
 Câmpulung-Muscel Bărăția, see Catholic Church in Romania

See also
 Baratia, a genus of bush crickets in the tribe Ephippigerini
 Baratie (disambiguation)